Clowns in the Sky: The Musical History of Mystery Science Theater 3000 is the title of a CD featuring music from the first seven seasons of Mystery Science Theater 3000.

Release
Released in 1996 exclusively through the MST3K Info Club, the songs featured include the many versions of the opening theme, the closing theme, and various tunes that were featured in host segments throughout the show. The CD takes its name from "A Clown in the Sky", the song featured in the last host segment of episode 303 (Pod People).

The complete albums were released on vinyl in 2019 by Shout Factory.

Track listing

See also
Rifftrax-who also released music as The Rifftones 
List of films considered the worst
Windham Hill

References

External links
 
 
 Satellite News song list

1996 albums
Mystery Science Theater 3000
Music based on television series
Comedy albums by American artists
Television soundtracks